Aster Fissehatsion (also known as Astier Fesehazion) (born 1956) is an Eritrean politician and an Amnesty International prisoner of conscience. She is the former wife of former Vice-President of Eritrea, Mahmoud Ahmed Sherifo.

She was detained in September 2001 for being part of the G-15. On 18 September 2001, she was detained indefinitely along with other politicians of G-15, a group which opposed the rule of Eritrean president Isaias Afewerki. Aster along with 15 other ministers were detained in unknown location ever since. The ministers were criticizing the border war of the then president, Isaias and signed an open letter.

Political life
She joined Eritrean People's Liberation Front (EPLF) in 1974 and became a leading figure in the struggle for independence in Eritrea. Following independence, she held the following positions: member of the Central Council of People's Front for Democracy and Justice (PFDJ)(In 1994, the EPLF changed its name to PFDJ) member of the National Assembly; Director of the Ministry of Labour and Social Affairs.

In 1996, Fissehatsion was dismissed from her job for criticising the increasingly authoritarian government, but was reinstated in 1999. In May 2001, she was one of 15 senior party officials, later known as the G-15, who published an open letter calling for "peaceful and democratic dialogue"; and calling on President Isaias Afewerki to  adhere to correct parliamentary and governance procedures, hold internal party meetings, and keep the promises made by the PFDJ in respect of judicial reform.

Arrest
She was detained in September 2001 for being part of the G-15. On 18 September 2001, she was detained indefinitely along with other politicians of G-15, a group which opposed the rule of Eritrean president Isaias Afewerki. Aster along with ten other ministers were detained in unknown location ever since. The ministers were criticizing the border war of the then president, Isaia and signed an open letter. He was considered a prisoner of conscience by Amnesty International. Since the arrest, various governments and self help groups have sought the Eritrean government to the release of the arrested. A mass campaign was launched in Amnesty International during 2011 to the effect. Amnesty International declared her and the ten others arrested as prisoner of conscience and sought immediate release of them. She was the only woman out of the 11 who were detained and out of the 15 who opposed, three fled the country and one withdrew support.

References

1956 births
Amnesty International prisoners of conscience held by Eritrea
Government ministers of Eritrea
Living people
Eritrean prisoners and detainees
Members of the National Assembly (Eritrea)
People's Front for Democracy and Justice politicians
Women government ministers of Eritrea